Lloyd Murad (born 9 April 1933) is a Venezuelan retired sprinter who competed in the 1960 Summer Olympics and in the 1964 Summer Olympics. He won a silver medal in the 1959 Pan American Games 4×100 metres relay.  He attended San Jose State College and was coached by Bud Winter.

References

1933 births
Living people
Venezuelan male sprinters
Olympic athletes of Venezuela
Athletes (track and field) at the 1960 Summer Olympics
Athletes (track and field) at the 1964 Summer Olympics
Pan American Games silver medalists for Venezuela
Athletes (track and field) at the 1959 Pan American Games
Pan American Games medalists in athletics (track and field)
Competitors at the 1959 Central American and Caribbean Games
Competitors at the 1962 Central American and Caribbean Games
Central American and Caribbean Games gold medalists for Venezuela
Central American and Caribbean Games medalists in athletics
Medalists at the 1959 Pan American Games
San Jose State Spartans men's track and field athletes
20th-century Venezuelan people
21st-century Venezuelan people